Euphaedra hewitsoni, or Hewitson's pink forester, is a butterfly in the family Nymphalidae. It is found in Nigeria, Cameroon, Equatorial Guinea, Gabon, the Republic of the Congo, the Central African Republic, the Democratic Republic of the Congo and Uganda. The habitat consists of wet forests.

Subspecies
E. h. hewitsoni (Cameroon, Gabon, Congo)
E. h. angusta Hecq, 1974 (northern and eastern Democratic Republic of the Congo, Uganda)
E. h. bipuncta Hecq, 1974 (southern Central African Republic, western and central Democratic Republic of Congo)
E. h. disclara Hecq, 1991 (Bioko)
E. h. sumptuosa Hecq, 1974 (southern Nigeria, western Cameroon)

References

Butterflies described in 1974
hewitsoni